St Peter Chanel School may refer to the following schools named for Peter Chanel:

Australia
 St Peter Chanel Primary School, in The Gap, Brisbane, Queensland

New Zealand
 St Peter Chanel School, Hamilton
 St Peter Chanel School, Motueka
 St Peter Chanel School, Ōtaki

The Philippines
 St Peter Chanel School of Cavite, in Cavite

The United States
 St. Peter Chanel High School, Bedford, Ohio

See also
 Chanel College (disambiguation)